(E)-2-epi-β-Caryophyllene synthase (EC 4.2.3.137, (E)-2-epi-β-caryophyllene synthase, SmMTPSL26) is an enzyme with systematic name (2E,6E)-farnesyl-diphosphate diphosphate-lyase (cyclizing, (E)-2-epi-β-caryophyllene-forming). This enzyme catalyses the following chemical reaction

 (2E,6E)-farnesyl diphosphate  (E)-2-epi-β-caryophyllene + diphosphate

This enzyme is isolated from the plant Selaginella moellendorffii.

References

External links 
 

EC 4.2.3